Nicholas C. Frost (born 1955), known professionally as Nicholas Farrell, is an English stage, film and television actor.

Education
Farrell was educated at Fryerns Grammar and Technical School in Basildon, Essex, followed by the University of Nottingham and the Bristol Old Vic Theatre School, alongside fellow pupil Daniel Day-Lewis.

Life and career
Farrell's early screen career included the role of Aubrey Montague in the 1981 film Chariots of Fire. In 1983, he starred as Edmund Bertram in a television adaptation of the Jane Austen novel, Mansfield Park. In 1984, he appeared in Greystoke: The Legend of Tarzan, Lord of the Apes and The Jewel in the Crown.

Since then, his film and television work has included several screen adaptations of Shakespeare's works, including Kenneth Branagh's 1996 Hamlet, in which he played Horatio, a role he had played previously with Branagh for the Royal Shakespeare Company. He has also appeared in film adaptations of Twelfth Night (1996), Othello (1995) and In the Bleak Midwinter (1995). He provided the voice of Hamlet for the animated television adaptation Shakespeare: The Animated Tales (1992). He played the role of Albert Dussell in the 2009 adaption of The Diary of Anne Frank, a BBC production. In 2011, he played Margaret Thatcher's close friend and advisor Airey Neave in The Iron Lady. In 2014, he portrayed Eyre Crowe in the British documentary drama miniseries 37 Days, about the weeks leading up to World War I.

Other television appearances have included two Agatha Christie's Poirot films, Sharpe's Regiment, To Play the King, Roman Mysteries, Torchwood and Collision. He has also appeared in episodes of Lovejoy, Foyle's War, Absolute Power, Spooks,  Midsomer Murders, Drop the Dead Donkey, Call the Midwife and  Casualty. He also voiced the Golem Pump 19 in the 2010 two-part adaption of Terry Pratchett's Going Postal.

Farrell's theatre work includes performances of The Cherry Orchard, Camille and The Crucible as well as Royal Shakespeare Company productions of The Merchant of Venice, Julius Caesar  and Hamlet. In the 2011 Chichester Festival he played schoolmasters Dewley and Crocker-Harris in the double bill of South Downs and The Browning Version. In 2021 he played Ebenezer Scrooge in A Christmas Carol: A Ghost Story at the Nottingham Playhouse.

Farrell also appeared in the Grace Kelly biopic Grace of Monaco alongside Nicole Kidman and Tim Roth, and the short film The Pit and the Pendulum: A Study in Torture, based on Edgar Allan Poe's short story.

He is married to Scottish actress Stella Gonet.

In 2021 he was chosen as the face of the Saga plc television campaign 'Experience is Everything'.

Selected film and television appearances

Film

Television

References

External links
 
 British Theatre Guide entry

1955 births
English male film actors
English male stage actors
English male television actors
Living people
People from Brentwood, Essex
Alumni of the University of Nottingham
Royal Shakespeare Company members
English expatriates in the United States